The Stoclet Frieze is a series of three mosaics created by the Austrian painter Gustav Klimt for a 1905-1911 commission for the Stoclet Palace in Brussels, Belgium. The panels depict swirling Tree of life, a standing female figure and an embracing couple.

Commission and display 
The mosaics form a part of a larger commission by the Belgian financier Adolphe Stoclet and his wife Suzanne. The Stoclets hired the architect Josef Hoffmann and the Wiener Werkstätte artistic collective (‘Viennese Workshop’) to design, decorate and furnish a spacious mansion with formal gardens. The pair were avid art collectors with wide-ranging and eclectic tastes: their collection included work from many periods and cultures, from the Far East to the New World and included Egyptian sculpture, Chinese ceramics and jades, Byzantine icons and jewelry, miniatures from Persia and Armenia, as well as numerous Western medieval paintings. The diverse tastes of his patrons corresponded well with Gustav Klimt's own. Art historian M.E. Warlick notes that he "must have been delighted to find that their eclectic collection so matched many of his own recent interests".

The panels were commissioned and placed along three walls of the Stoclet Palace's dining room, with the two larger, figural sections set across from each other along the longer walls of the room. A smaller geometric panel occupies the short wall separating them. The designs are decorated with a variety of luxury materials, including marble, ceramic, gilded tiles and enamel along with pearls and other semi-precious stones.

When an official party of Belgian architects visited the Stoclet Palace for the very first time, on 22 September 1912, the excitement amongst it members was great. Everything from the Palace's ground plan to its silver spoons had been designed and executed by Hoffmann and the artists and craftsmen of the Wiener Werkstätte. Amidst the historicist façades lining the elegant Avenue de Tervueren/Tervurenlaan, the entire ensemble of house, garden and interior – culminating in the dining room with the celebrated Tree of Life frieze by Klimt– struck the Belgian architects as belonging to another world. "I think I'm on the planet Mars!" exclaimed one of the architects in disbelief during his visit.

Gallery
The three mosaics were originally displayed on three separate walls, with the Knight mosaic positioned centrally and the larger mosaics, each centering on a Tree of Life motif, positioned on walls to the left and right.

See also
 The Tree of Life, Stoclet Frieze

References

Bibliography
Freytag, Annette. "Josef Hoffmann's Unknown Masterpiece: The Garden of Stoclet House in Brussels (1905–1911)," Studies in the History of Gardens and Designed Landscapes, Vol. 30, No. 4, pp. 337–372.
Warlick, M.E. "Mythic Rebirth in Gustav Klimt's Stoclet Frieze: New Considerations of Its Egyptianizing Form and Content," The Art Bulletin, Vol. 74, No. 1 (March 1992), pp. 115–134.

External links
 Klimt Museum appreciation page gallery of close-up images

Mosaics
Paintings by Gustav Klimt
Wiener Werkstätte